Short-track speed skating at the 1999 Asian Winter Games took place in the province of Gangwon, South Korea, with ten events contested – five each for men and women.

Schedule

Medalists

Men

Women

Medal table

Participating nations
A total of 37 athletes from 6 nations competed in short-track speed skating at the 1999 Asian Winter Games:

References
 Results of the Fourth Winter Asian Games

External links
 Official website

 
1999 Asian Winter Games events
Asian Winter Games
1999
International speed skating competitions hosted by South Korea